Gajendra Vitthal Ahire is an Indian Marathi film maker and screenwriter. Till now, he has 57 movies on his name in all of which he has contributed as Director, Story, Screenplay, Dialogues and Lyrics. He is noted for his work in Marathi cinema, including a 2003 'Not Only Mrs. Raut' , 2007 biopic about Vasudev Balwant Phadke and has also worked as a television screenwriter for programs such as Shrimaan-Shrimati. He has won the National award for the Best Feature Film in Marathi for Shevri in 2006 and Not Only Mrs. Raut in 2003. His film Pimpal also won awards.

International critically acclaimed and multi-award winner Gajendra Ahire won (Rajat Kamal) Silver Lotus Award and got international breakthrough when he directed Not Only Mrs. Raut and it was nominated as official entry for best regional language movie for many annual Film festivals across the globe in 2003 and won many awards too.
Gajendra Ahire received numerous awards and recognition for his creative, talented literary works in field of cinema and theater. He has written more than 800 episodes for television's famous serials in Hindi and Marathi language. Later he began directing regional language movies and appeared in several significant roles in Marathi feature films and won many category awards for his story, screenplay, direction & best film.

He is highly active in theater field for which he has been recognized by Govt. of India, Govt. of Maharashtra and various Institutions across India and abroad for thirty years.

Personal life
Gajendra Ahire was born on February 16, 1969, in Nashik district india  and brought up in Mumbai. He is married to Marathi cinema actress Vrinda Ahire, with whom he has a son.

Career
He began his career as a playwright at the age of 23. His first play was Aaicha Ghar Unhacha in which he also worked as an actor. After that, he wrote plays like Unch Maza Jhoka Ga, Ek Diwas Yeilach, and Janmasiddha. And after 20 years of Marathi Cinema, he has made a comeback in Marathi Play with his recent play, Shevgyachya Shenga.

After his initial plays, he moved to television and wrote more than 2000 episodes for Hindi and Marathi TV Serials. Out of which 'Shrimaan Shrimati' of Balaji Telefilms is one of his notable works.

Later, he began directing films and appeared in several significant roles in Marathi Feature Films. He is one of those rare Filmmakers who contribute to all of their films with own story, screenplay, dialogues and lyrics along with directing the Film. He has made his Film-making debut in 2003 from an award-winning movie, 'Not Only Mrs. Raut' which then won numerous awards including Silver Lotus Award and Maharashtra State Film Award. In chronological order, his first movie was 2002's 'Krishna Katachi Mira which was not released. However, this movie won 3 Maharashtra State Film Awards, too. Best Actress, Best Singer (Male) and Best Singer (Female).

He also has contributed as Music Director for his Nyiff award-winning film, Anumati.

In 2019, Gajendra Ahire directed his 50th film Kulkarni Chaukatla Deshpande, a drama starring Sai Tamhankar in titular role.

Awards

 Filmfare Awards 2014 (Marathi) 
 2015 - CRITICS' BEST FILM  -''' Shared with Paresh Mokashi (Elizabeth Ekadashi)  for  Postcard

 Stuttgart Indian Film Festival 
 2015 - The Director's Vision Award for 'The Silence'

 National Film Awards 

 2007 - Best Feature Film in Marathi Shevri

 Silver Lotus Awards 

 2003 - Not Only Mrs. Raut
 2006 - Shevri

 Maharashtra State Film Awards 

 17 awards in total for film, writing, direction, lyrics, dialogues
 Best Director to handle 'Social Subject' 
 Best Director to handle 'Rural Subject'

 New York Indian Film Festival [Nyiff] 

 2013 - 'Anumati' awarded Best Feature Film

 Mama Varerkar Smriti Award 
 1994 Marathi Play 'Aaicha Ghar Unhacha'''

Filmography

Marathi films

Hindi films

Theater

Television

References

External links 
 
 timesofindia

Living people
Indian male screenwriters
Marathi film directors
1969 births
Film directors from Mumbai
Film producers from Mumbai
Marathi film producers
Screenwriters from Mumbai
21st-century Indian film directors
Marathi screenwriters
21st-century Indian dramatists and playwrights
21st-century Indian male writers
21st-century Indian screenwriters